Pro Plus may refer to:
 Pro Plus (company), a media company in Slovenia
 Professional Plus, an edition of Microsoft Office software suite
 Pro Plus, a brand of caffeine pill